Storm is the fourth album by the American electronic act Assemblage 23.  It was released on September 28, 2004, on Metropolis Records and Accession Records. Storm is a much more layered album than any of Shear's previous work and the songs are much more optimistic in nature.

Track listing
All songs written, performed and produced by Tom Shear

References

2004 albums
Assemblage 23 albums
Accession Records albums
Metropolis Records albums